The National Union of General Workers is the name of:

 National Union of General Workers (Sohyo), a former trade union in Japan
 National Union of General Workers (Zenrokyo), a trade union in Japan
 National Union of General Workers (UK), a former trade union in the UK
 Zenroren National Union of General Workers, a trade union in Japan